Alfred Campbell may refer to:

Alfred Walter Campbell, a prominent Australian neurologist
Alfred Eric Campbell, a British-born early Hollywood actor

See also
Al Campbell (disambiguation)